Selishtë is a village and a former municipality in the Dibër County, northeastern Albania. At the 2015 local government reform it became a subdivision of the municipality Dibër. The population at the 2011 census was 1,605. The toponym is Slavic (Selište).

A rudimentary chrome mine functions in the village. It makes the headlines occasionally due to the occasional death of miners in accidents.

References

Former municipalities in Dibër County
Administrative units of Dibër (municipality)
Villages in Dibër County